Ronald David "Ron" Parraguirre (born July 8, 1959) is a justice of the Nevada Supreme Court. He was appointed in 2004, and his term ends in 2023. He is also a former president of the Nevada District Judges Association. He received his Juris Doctor from the University of San Diego School of Law.

He served as chief justice from January 4, 2016 to January 4, 2017. He began a new term as chief on January 5, 2022.

References

|-

|-

|-

1959 births
21st-century American judges
Chief Justices of the Nevada Supreme Court
Justices of the Nevada Supreme Court
Living people
Place of birth missing (living people)
University of San Diego School of Law alumni